Terlecki (feminine: Terlecka; plural: Terleccy) is a Polish surname, if nobleman might be Klamry or Sas coat of arms. In other language variants: Terlecky, Terlesky, Terlezki (English), Terletzki (German), Terleckas (Lithuanian). Notable people include:

  (1952–2012), Polish politician 
 Bob Terlecki (born 1945), American baseball player
 Cyril Terlecki (died 1607), Ukrainian bishop
 Hipolit Terlecki (1806–1890), Polish theologian
 Josephine Terlecki (born 1986), German athlete
 Maciej Terlecki (born 1977), Polish footballer
 Metodije Terlecki (died 1649), bishop of the Bishopric of Chelm
 Ryszard Terlecki (born 1949), Polish historian and politician
 Stanisław Terlecki (1955–2017), Polish footballer
  (1933–1999), Polish writer

Variants 
 Frank Terletzki (born 1950), German football coach and player
 Greg Terlecky (born 1952), Major League Baseball pitcher
 John Terlesky (born 1961), American actor, film director, television director and screenwriter
 Stefan Terlezki (1927–2006), British Conservative politician
 Vladas Terleckas (born 1939), Lithuanian politician

See also
 

Polish-language surnames
de:Terlecki
pl:Terlecki